The 1908 George Washington Hatchetites football team represented George Washington University in the 1908 college football season. Led by second year coach Fred K. Nielsen, the team went 8–1–1 and were one of two teams given the mythical title of Southern champion. The Colonials outscored opponents 297 to 28.  Curley Byrd was a member of the team.

Schedule

References

George Washington
George Washington Colonials football seasons
George Washington Hatchetites football